Přední kout is a small hill in the South Moravia, Czech Republic. With an altitude of 410 m it is the highest elevation in the hilly landscape around Hustopeče. There is a station of Global Automated System for Frequency Spectrum Monitoring (GASFSM) near its top.

References

 list of czech mountains
 Antonín Buček, Jan Lacina, Zdeněk Laštůvka: PANNONIAN STEPPE GRASSLANDS IN MORAVIA, P. 28

Mountains and hills of the Czech Republic
Populated places in Břeclav District